The title Bus of the Year and Coach of the Year, also known as International Bus of the Year and International Coach of the Year, is on alternate years awarded to bus and coach models on the European market. The competition has been organized by several European bus-related publications since 1989.

The competition 

In early summer, three to six bus or coach models that have been submitted by their manufacturers undergo the Bus Euro Test or the Coach Euro Test. The jury consists of around 20 (currently 19) journalists from bus and coach related publications from all over Europe. In odd years the coaches are tested and in even years the buses are tested, and the winner receives the award entitled for the following year. So at Coach Euro Test 2015, the Coach of the Year 2016 is chosen, and at Bus Euro Test 2016, the Bus of the Year 2017 is chosen. Only the winner is presented, no runners-up.

The award ceremonies take place at exhibitions in the autumn, with Bus of the Year at the IAA Nutzfahrzeuge in Hanover and Coach of the Year at Busworld Europe in Brussels.

Jury members 
The following 19 European publications each appoint a journalist to the jury in Bus & Coach of the Year. (List as of November 2014.)

Winners

See also

 List of motor vehicle awards
 International Truck of the Year

References

External links 

Bus of the Year Award

Buses
Commercial vehicle awards
Motor vehicle awards